Ambalanduwa Grama Niladhari Division is a Grama Niladhari Division of the Panadura Divisional Secretariat  of Kalutara District  of Western Province, Sri Lanka .  It has Grama Niladhari Division Code 675A.

Ambalanduwa is a surrounded by the Bekkegama, Walana North, Thotawatta and Galthude North  Grama Niladhari Divisions.

Demographics

Ethnicity 

The Ambalanduwa Grama Niladhari Division has a Moor majority (90.2%) . In comparison, the Panadura Divisional Secretariat (which contains the Ambalanduwa Grama Niladhari Division) has a Sinhalese majority (84.6%) and a significant Moor population (14.1%)

Religion 

The Ambalanduwa Grama Niladhari Division has a Muslim majority (93.0%) . In comparison, the Panadura Divisional Secretariat (which contains the Ambalanduwa Grama Niladhari Division) has a Buddhist majority (78.6%) and a significant Muslim population (14.4%)

Grama Niladhari Divisions of Panadura Divisional Secretariat

References